Louisiana Hussy is a 1959 American film directed by Lee Sholem.

The film is also known as Louisiana Hussey (American alternative spelling).

Plot summary 
Living in a small Louisiana Bayou community known as "The Pit", Cajun newlyweds Pierre and Lili must deal with family conflict compounded by the arrival in their lives of a mysterious seductress who calls herself "Minette" and claims to be fleeing from trouble.  Not convinced she is being truthful, the couple find out that her real name is "Nina" and that she is impersonating a woman who had earlier committed suicide after having discovered that Nina was having an affair with her husband, Clay. Meanwhile, Pierre's brother Jacques, has fallen in love with Nina, to the disapproval of his family. Pierre and Lili track down Clay's whereabouts but are convinced by his butler not to reveal the location of Nina. Clay, suspecting that the couple is hiding information, follows them back to their home but at the last minute decides not to confront Nina, realizing that she has caused enough pain in his life. Nina is told to leave The Pit and in the final scene, is picked up hitch hiking by a middle aged man driving a Cadillac. She tells that man that she is fleeing trouble and needs help.

Cast 
Nan Peterson as Nina Duprez, alias Minette Lanier
Robert Richards as Pierre Guillot
Peter Coe as Jacques Guillot
Betty Lynn as Lili Guillot
Howard Wright as Cob
Harry Lauter as Clay Lanier
Rosalee Calvert as the real Minette Lanier
Tyler McVey as Dr. J. B. Opie
Smoki Whitfield as Burt, the manservant
Helen Forrest as Callie, the grisgris woman

References

External links 

1959 films
American crime drama films
1959 crime drama films
American black-and-white films
1950s English-language films
1950s American films